Padmanava Behara is  an Indian politician. Member of Legislative assembly Odisha from Birmaharajpur Constituency and the Minister of Commerce and Transport  in Odisha Government.

References

External links
Official biographical sketch in Parliament of India website

1956 births
Living people
Lok Sabha members from Odisha
Biju Janata Dal politicians